The Chinese Artistic Gymnastics Championships is an annual Chinese national artistic gymnastics competition.

Medalists

Women

All-around

Vault

Uneven Bars

Balance Beam

Floor Exercise

Men

All-around

References

External links 
 Chinese Gymnastics Assiciation profile 

 
China
Gymnastics artistic
Gymnastics competitions in China